"Amor En Tus Ojos" is a song by Colombian-American latin pop singer-songwriter Soraya. The song was released as the third single from her bilingual debut studio album En Esta Noche / On Nights Like This (1996). The song was written, recorded and produced by Soraya, Peter Van Hooke and Rod Argent. An English-language version called "Love in Your Eyes" was released on the English/international edition of the album On Nights Like This.

Track listing

Charts

References

1996 singles
1996 songs
Island Records singles
Song recordings produced by Rod Argent
Songs written by Soraya (musician)
Soraya (musician) songs